Thomas Joseph Lawlor (born May 15, 1983) is an American professional wrestler, retired mixed martial artist and podcast host. He is best known for his time in Major League Wrestling (MLW), where he was a former one-time MLW World Heavyweight Champion and the winner of the first-ever Battle Riot in 2018 and the 2020 Opera Cup tournament. He currently appears for New Japan Pro-Wrestling, where he was the inaugural  Strong Openweight Champion.

Lawlor competed in the Light Heavyweight division of the UFC. A professional since 2007, he was also a cast member of SpikeTV's The Ultimate Fighter: Team Nogueira vs. Team Mir.

Early life
Lawlor was born in Fall River, Massachusetts before moving to Swansea, Massachusetts, and then finally to Fort Myers, Florida. He attended Estero High School in Florida and was on the wrestling team, then continued his wrestling career at the University of Central Florida where he won three NCWA national championships in the 235 lb weight class in 2003, 2004, 2005 and as a freshman placed third. He began Brazilian jiu-jitsu in his home town of Fall River. Lawlor had a sister who died in a car accident in 2001.  He dedicated his UFC on Fuel TV 9 win to his late sister.

Mixed martial arts
Lawlor previously lived in Providence, RI. He, along with TUF alumni and MMA veteran Seth Petruzelli and Brazilian jiu-jitsu Black Belt Mike Lee, was previously a part-owner and coach at The Jungle MMA – Orlando BJJ, MMA, Muay Thai The Jungle MMA and Fitness. He currently trains at Lauzon MMA and works with Team Aggression in Bridgewater, Massachusetts.

Lawlor has made himself known by imitating other fighters (Art Jimmerson, Dan Severn, Harold Howard, Genki Sudo, and Conor McGregor) during the weigh-ins and octagon entrances. These impersonations, along with his tongue-in-cheek ring entrance routines (paying homage to Hulk Hogan and Apollo Creed amongst others) have made Lawlor something of a cult figure among fans. In 2010, Lawlor announced his intention to tone down his pre-fight antics.

Amateur career
Before turning professional in 2007, Lawlor made his MMA debut as an amateur in 2003, facing Rich Mitchell at Xtreme Fighting 5 on July 26, 2003. He won via KO just under a minute into the fight, and would subsequently take time off from MMA.

The Ultimate Fighter
Lawlor appeared on the eighth season of The Ultimate Fighter. He submitted Ryan Lopez with a rear naked choke in the elimination round to earn his spot in the TUF house. He was chosen by Frank Mir to be a part of Team Mir.

He was selected to fight first against Ryan Bader and despite a good showing, Lawlor lost by knockout in the first round, due to a ground and pound punches.

Ultimate Fighting Championship
Lawlor won his UFC debut against former The Ultimate Fighter 8 castmate Kyle Kingsbury via unanimous decision. They fought on the preliminary card at The Ultimate Fighter 8 Finale. After the fight with Kingsbury, Lawlor moved down in weight after realizing he was too small for light heavyweight.

Lawlor had his second fight for the UFC, when he took on C. B. Dollaway at UFC 100. Tom won in an upset, putting Dollaway to sleep with a guillotine choke 55 seconds into the first round and was awarded Submission of the Night honors.

Lawlor fought Aaron Simpson on January 11, 2010, at UFC Fight Night 20. Lawlor showed off his improved striking skills in the first round by dominating Simpson, but lost a controversial split decision after gassing in the third round. However, the decision of the fight was met with widespread criticism toward the current scoring system in Mixed Martial Arts.

Lawlor was scheduled to face Tim Credeur on May 8, 2010, at UFC 113, but Credeur was forced off the card with an injury. Lawlor instead faced Joe Doerksen, losing via submission in the second round.

Lawlor earned a much needed victory over Patrick Cote on October 23, 2010, at UFC 121 in a performance that once again displayed Lawlor's superb wrestling and jiu jitsu skills by successfully executing five takedowns, threatening with submissions (nearly finishing Cote in the first round with an arm-triangle choke before Cote blatantly grabbed the fence to escape) in every round and showing his improved cardio as he easily cruised to a 30-27 unanimous decision victory.

Lawlor was expected to face Maiquel Falcão on August 27, 2011, at UFC 134 but Falcao was suddenly released from the promotion on May 11. Lawlor was expected to remain on the Brazilian card, but instead took a bout against Kyle Noke on August 14, 2011, at UFC on Versus 5.  However, Lawlor pulled out of the fight in early July 2011.

Lawlor lost to Chris Weidman on November 19, 2011, at UFC 139 due to a D'Arce choke in 2:07 of the first round.

Lawlor faced Jason MacDonald on May 15, 2012, his birthday, at UFC on Fuel TV: Korean Zombie vs. Poirier. He won the fight via KO in the first round and earned Knockout of the Night for his efforts.

Lawlor fought Francis Carmont on November 17, 2012, at UFC 154. At the weigh in, Lawlor wore a mask resembling that of the professional wrestler the Shockmaster and deliberately tripped going through the curtain in an homage to the Shockmaster incident. Despite controlling the majority of the fight and threatening with several submissions, he lost the fight via a controversial split decision

Lawlor faced Michael Kuiper on April 6, 2013, at UFC on Fuel TV 9. After losing the first round, he rebounded and won via submission, a guillotine choke, early in the second round. During his post victory speech, Lawlor had dedicated his fight to his late sister; Katie.

Lawlor was expected to face Ilir Latifi in a light heavyweight bout on July 19, 2014, at UFC Fight Night 46. However, Lawlor was forced out of the bout due to injury, and was replaced by promotional newcomer Chris Dempsey.

After over two years away from active competition, Lawlor returned to face Gian Villante on July 25, 2015, at UFC on Fox 16.  He won the fight via knockout in the second round and also earned a Performance of the Night bonus.

Lawlor was expected to face Fábio Maldonado on November 7, 2015, at UFC Fight Night 77. However, Lawlor was forced out of the bout with injury and replaced by Corey Anderson.

Lawlor faced Corey Anderson on March 5, 2016, at UFC 196. He lost the fight by unanimous decision.

On November 4, 2016, Lawlor was provisionally suspended from the UFC stemming from an out-of-competition drug test conducted by USADA on October 10, 2016. Lawlor revealed that he failed for Ostarine, although he denied knowing the cause of the failure. In February 2017, Lawlor was handed a two-year suspension. He became eligible to return to competition in October 2018.

On August 13, 2018, Tom Lawlor was released from UFC, less than two months before his suspension was lifted. At the time of his release, he held a record of 6–5 within the promotion.

Post-UFC career
On November 24, 2018, Lawlor faced Deron Winn at Golden Boy Promotions's inaugural MMA event. He lost the fight by unanimous decision.

Professional Fighters League 
in March 2020, Lawlor signed with Professional Fighters League and is expected to participate in the PFL season 3 light heavyweight bracket.

Lawlor was set to face Jordan Johnson on April 29, 2021 at PFL 2 as the start of the 2021 PFL Light Heavyweight tournament. However, in March, it was announced that Johnson pulled out and was replaced by promotional newcomer Antônio Carlos Júnior. He lost the bout via guillotine choke in the first round.

Lawlor faced Jordan Young at PFL 5 on June 17, 2021. He won the bout via unanimous decision and then retired by placing his gloves down in the center of the mat after the win.

Professional wrestling career

Independent circuit (2014–present) 
Before the start of his MMA career, Lawlor worked two years as a professional wrestler on the Florida independent circuit, even taking part in a WWE tryout.

On May 17, 2014, Lawlor made his Ring of Honor debut accompanying reDRagon as their manager against The Young Bucks in their match for the ROH World Tag Team Championship at the ROH and New Japan Pro-Wrestling co-promoted pay-per-view War of the Worlds. Lawlor returned to professional wrestling in February 2017, due to his suspension from UFC. On April 15, 2017, Lawlor debuted for Prestige Championship Wrestling competing against Davey Richards in the shows co-main event. Lawlor would lose the match but would go on to become a regular at Prestige shows. On May 5, 2017, Lawlor was advertised for Canadian promotion All Star Wrestling for their 7 July 2017 show. On May 26 and 27, Lawlor participated in the AIW JT Lightening Invitational Tournament. Day 1, he was set to face Jimmy Rave but Rave dropped out of the show due to travel issues. Instead, UFC Legend and former NWA World Champion Dan Severn answered Lawlor's challenge. Lawlor pinned Severn to advance. Day 2, Lawlor was in a Fatal Four-Way with Tracy Williams, Mike Tolar and Dominic Garrini. Williams would win the match and the tournament.

Major League Wrestling (2017–2021) 

Since their 2017 relaunch, Lawlor has competed in Major League Wrestling (MLW), and appears on their weekly MLW Fusion television series. Lawlor won the first Battle Riot in MLW in 2018. He won after eliminating Jake Hager, who he went on to feud with. He followed that up by beating Sami Callihan, Shane Strickland and his former partner Simon Gotch in singles matches.

On February 2, 2019, Lawlor won the MLW World Heavyweight Championship from Low Ki at MLW's live SuperFight event. He would hold the title 154 days, before losing it to Jacob Fatu at Kings of Colosseum in July 2019. He would also fail to defeat Fatu in a rematch for the title. On November 14, 2019, it was announced Lawlor left the promotion. However, on November 22, 2019 it was announced he had signed a new multi-year exclusive agreement with the company. Lawlor turned heel on the Thanksgiving episode of Fusion by attacking Ross Von Erich with a chair during his world title bout against Jacob Fatu.

New Japan Pro-Wrestling (2020–present) 
On the July 12, 2020 episode of Lion's Break Collision, Lawlor made his New Japan Pro-Wrestling debut, defeating Rocky Romero. Lawlor immediately aligned himself with J. R. Kratos and Taylor Rust, forming the NJPW version of Team Filthy. The group later added The West Coast Wrecking Crew (Jorel Nelson and Royce Isaacs) and Danny Limelight. After a loss against Jeff Cobb, Lawlor kicked Rust out of Team Filthy, replacing him with Chris Dickinson. However, Dickinson later aligned himself with Brody King at the ROH 19th Anniversary Show, causing tension amongst Team Filthy. Dickinson refused to commit to Team Filthy's violent actions on the following weeks episodes of NJPW Strong, further straining the groups relationship with Dickinson. In April 2021, Lawlor competed in the New Japan Cup USA tournament to crown the first ever NJPW Strong Openweight Champion. He defeated the DKC in a qualifying match, Ren Narita in the first round, Hikuleo in the semi-finals, and Brody King in the finals to win the New Japan Cup USA and become the first ever NJPW Strong Openweight Champion. Team Filthy and Dickinson's relationship finally ended when Dickinson challenged Lawlor for the title as his first challenger, causing Lawlor and Team Filthy to attack Dickinson, removing him from the faction. 

In May 2021, Lawlor defeated Dickinson to retain his Strong Openweight Championship at Collision. Lawlor retained against Karl Fredericks at Ignition. Lawlor continued to retain the title against challengers such as Satoshi Kojima, Lio Rush and Ren Narita. At Detonation, Lawlor defeated Fred Rosser. He made further title defences against Taylor Rust and Clark Connors before losing the title Rosser at Collision, in a match where if Rosser lost he'd have to leave NJPW Strong, ending Lawlor's reign at 397 days.

At Dominion 6.12 in Osaka-jo Hall, Lawlor was announced to be a participant in the G1 Climax 32 tournament as a part of the A Block, making his tournament debut and his NJPW debut in Japan. Lawlor ended his campaign with 6 points, failing to advance to the semi-finals.

Other media
In May 2015, Figure Four Online launched the Filthy Tom Lawlor Show (later renamed Filthy Four Daily), a weekly podcast featuring Lawlor discussing MMA and professional wrestling with host Bryan Alvarez. In September 2016, it was announced he would be making monthly appearances on The Bryan and Vinny Show to discuss SmackDown Live pay-per-views. He has also made appearances on Wrestling Observer Radio.

He is the co-host of the FRB Show with Front Row Brian.

Personal life
Lawlor currently resides in Las Vegas, NV.

Championships and accomplishments

Amateur wrestling
National Collegiate Wrestling Association
 NCWA National 235lbs Champion (2003, 2004, 2005)

Mixed martial arts
Ultimate Fighting Championship
Fight of the Night (One time) 
Knockout of the Night (One time) 
Submission of the Night (One time) 
Performance of the Night (One time)

Professional wrestling
Absolute Intense Wrestling
AIW Absolute Championship (1 time)
Black Label Pro
BLP Heavyweight Championship (1 time)
 BLP Midwest Championship (1 time)
BLP Heavyweight Championship Tournament (2017)
Division One Pro Wrestling
FX Cup (2008)
Major League Wrestling
 MLW World Heavyweight Championship (1 time)
Battle Riot (2018)
Opera Cup (2020)
New Japan Pro-Wrestling
Strong Openweight Championship (1 time, inaugural)
New Japan Cup USA (2021)
Prestige Wrestling
Prestige Championship (1 time)
Prestige Rise or Die Tournament (2019)
Pro Wrestling Illustrated
Ranked No. 59 of the top 500 singles wrestlers in the PWI 500 in 2021

Mixed martial arts record

|-
|Win
|align=center|11–8 (1)
|Jordan Young
|Decision (unanimous)
|PFL 5
|
|align=center|3
|align=center|5:00
|Atlantic City, New Jersey, United States
|
|-
|Loss
|align=center|10–8 (1)
|Antônio Carlos Júnior
|Submission (guillotine choke)
|PFL 2
|
|align=center|1
|align=center|4:43
|Atlantic City, New Jersey, United States
|
|-
|Loss
|align=center|10–7 (1)
|Deron Winn
|Decision (unanimous)
|Golden Boy Promotions: Liddell vs. Ortiz 3
|
|align=center|3
|align=center|5:00
|Inglewood, California, United States
|
|-
|Loss
|align=center|10–6 (1)
|Corey Anderson
|Decision (unanimous)
|UFC 196
|
|align=center|3
|align=center|5:00
|Las Vegas, Nevada, United States
|
|-
|Win
|align=center|10–5 (1)
|Gian Villante
|KO (punch)
|UFC on Fox: Dillashaw vs. Barão 2
|
|align=center|2
|align=center|0:27
|Chicago, Illinois, United States
|
|-
|Win
|align=center|9–5 (1)
|Michael Kuiper
|Submission (guillotine choke)
|UFC on Fuel TV: Mousasi vs. Latifi
|
|align=center|2
|align=center|1:05
|Stockholm, Sweden
|
|-
|Loss
|align=center|8–5 (1)
|Francis Carmont
|Decision (split)
|UFC 154
|
|align=center|3
|align=center|5:00
|Montreal, Quebec, Canada
|
|-
|Win
|align=center|8–4 (1)
|Jason MacDonald
|KO (punch)
|UFC on Fuel TV: The Korean Zombie vs. Poirier
|
|align=center|1
|align=center|0:50
|Fairfax, Virginia, United States
|
|-
|Loss
|align=center|7–4 (1)
|Chris Weidman
|Technical Submission (D'Arce choke)
|UFC 139
|
|align=center|1
|align=center|2:07
|San Jose, California, United States
|
|-
|Win
|align=center|7–3 (1)
|Patrick Côté
|Decision (unanimous)
|UFC 121
|
|align=center|3
|align=center|5:00
|Anaheim, California, United States
|
|-
|Loss
|align=center|6–3 (1)
|Joe Doerksen
|Submission (rear-naked choke)
|UFC 113
|
|align=center|2
|align=center|2:10
|Montreal, Quebec, Canada
|
|-
|Loss
|align=center|6–2 (1)
|Aaron Simpson
|Decision (split)
|UFC Fight Night: Maynard vs. Diaz
|
|align=center|3
|align=center|5:00
|Fairfax, Virginia, United States
|
|-
|Win
|align=center|6–1 (1)
|C. B. Dollaway
|Technical submission (guillotine choke)
|UFC 100
|
|align=center|1
|align=center|0:55
|Las Vegas, Nevada, United States
|
|-
|Win
|align=center|5–1 (1)
|Kyle Kingsbury
|Decision (unanimous)
|The Ultimate Fighter: Team Nogueira vs Team Mir Finale
|
|align=center|3
|align=center|5:00
|Las Vegas, Nevada, United States
|
|-
|Win
|align=center|4–1 (1)
|Travis Bartlett
|Technical submission (guillotine choke)
|Full Force 20
|
|align=center|1
|align=center|1:10
|Foxborough, Massachusetts, United States
|
|-
|Loss
|align=center|3–1 (1)
|Shane Primm
|DQ (illegal knee to the head)
|World Fighting Championships 6
|
|align=center|1
|align=center|0:24
|Tampa, Florida, United States
|
|-
|Win
|align=center|3–0 (1)
|Cesar Barros
|KO (punches)
|Full Force 15
|
|align=center|1
|align=center|0:10
|Mansfield, Massachusetts, United States
|
|-
|Win
|align=center|2–0 (1)
|Jason Barlog
|TKO (punches)
|WFC 3
|
|align=center|1
|align=center|3:59
|Tampa, Florida, United States
|
|-
|Win
|align=center| 1–0 (1)
|Jonathan Fernandez
|Submission (rear naked choke)
|X-treme Fighting Championships
|
|align=center| 1
|align=center| 1:20
|Tampa, Florida, United States
|
|-
|NC
|align=center|0–0 (1)
|Ariel Gandulla
|No Contest
|Kick Enterprises
|
|align=center|1
|align=center|N/A
|Fort Myers, Florida, United States
|

Amateur mixed martial arts record

|-
|Win
|align=center| 1–0
|Rich Mitchell
|KO (punches)
|XF: Xtreme Fighting 5
|
|align=center| 1
|align=center| 0:54
|Fall River, Massachusetts, United States
|

See also
 List of male mixed martial artists

References

External links
 Tom Lawlor at PFL
 
 
 

1982 births
Living people
Sportspeople from Fall River, Massachusetts
American male mixed martial artists
Mixed martial artists from Massachusetts
Middleweight mixed martial artists
Mixed martial artists utilizing collegiate wrestling
Mixed martial artists utilizing Brazilian jiu-jitsu
Ultimate Fighting Championship male fighters
American male professional wrestlers
American male sport wrestlers
Professional wrestlers from Massachusetts
American practitioners of Brazilian jiu-jitsu
People awarded a black belt in Brazilian jiu-jitsu
Wrestling Observer Newsletter
University of Central Florida alumni
MLW World Heavyweight Champions